Regina Carter (born August 6, 1966) is an American jazz violinist. She is the cousin of jazz saxophonist James Carter.

Early life

Carter was born in Detroit and was one of three children in her family.

She began piano lessons at the age of two after playing a melody by ear for her brother's piano teacher. After she deliberately played the wrong ending note at a concert, the piano teacher suggested she take up the violin, indicating that the Suzuki Method could be more conducive to her creativity. Carter's mother enrolled her at the Detroit Community Music School when she was four years old and she began studying the violin. She still studied the piano, as well as tap and ballet.

As a teenager, she played in the youth division of the Detroit Symphony Orchestra. While at school, she was able to take master classes from Itzhak Perlman and Yehudi Menuhin.

Carter attended Cass Technical High School with a close friend, jazz singer Carla Cook, who introduced her to Ella Fitzgerald. In high school, Carter performed with the Detroit Civic Orchestra and played in a pop-funk group named Brainstorm. In addition to taking violin lessons, she also took viola, oboe, and choir lessons.

Carter was studying classical violin at the New England Conservatory of Music in Boston when she decided to switch to jazz. She transferred to Oakland University in Rochester, Michigan where she was a jazz major under the direction of Marvin "Doc" Holladay. She also studied and performed with trumpeter Marcus Belgrave. Through Belgrave, Carter was able to meet musicians active in the Detroit jazz scene, including Lyman Woodard. She graduated in 1985. After graduating, she taught strings in Detroit public schools. Needing a change of scene, she moved to Europe and lived in Germany for two years. While making connections, she worked as a nanny for a German family and taught violin on a U.S. military base.

Career
Carter returned to the U.S. and first came into the spotlight as the violinist for the all female pop-jazz quintet Straight Ahead in 1987, with Cynthia Dewberry, Gayelynn McKinney, Eileen Orr, and Marion Hayden. In the early to mid-1990s, Branford Marsalis was quoted as saying, "They truly swing." They released a trio of albums on the Atlantic Jazz label including their self-titled debut, Body and Soul, and Look Straight Ahead. Carter went solo before the release of their third album, Dance of the Forest Rain. In 1991 she left the band and moved to New York City.

While in New York she was a relative unknown and undertook work accompanying performers such as Aretha Franklin, Lauryn Hill, Mary J. Blige, Billy Joel, and Dolly Parton. She also played with Max Roach and Oliver Lake, as well as being in the String Trio of New York. Carter worked on the albums Intermobility (1993), Octagon (1994), and Blues ... ? (1996) with the group.

While with the trio, she released her first solo CD, Regina Carter (1995). Dedicated to her mother, Something for Grace was released in 1997. She toured with Wynton Marsalis for the 1997 production Blood on the Fields. She then changed record companies, from Atlantic Records to Verve Music Group, which allowed her more artistic freedom and she released Rhythms of the Heart (1999). The album Motor City Moments, paying homage to her hometown, was released in 2000.

In December 2001, she played a concert in Genoa using Il Cannone Guarnerius, a violin that was made in 1743 and was once owned and favoured by Niccolò Paganini. The violin was bequeathed to Genoa after Paganini's death in 1840. The name of instrument is given because an "explosive" sound can be achieved. Carter was invited to play after the incidents of the September 11 attacks as a gesture of solidarity. She was both the first jazz musician and African American to play the instrument. She later recorded Paganini: After a Dream for Verve Records. The album featured classical works by Maurice Ravel and Claude Debussy, and Cinema Paradiso by Ennio Morricone.

I'll Be Seeing You: A Sentimental Journey, Carter's sixth CD and was conceived as a tribute album to her late mother, which included some of her favorites as well as American standards from the 1920s-1940s. Some songs include "Blue Rose" (Duke Ellington), "Sentimental Journey" (Les Brown), "A-Tisket, A-Tasket" (Ella Fitzgerald), as well as "I'll Be Seeing You".

Active as an educator, mentor, and proponent of the Suzuki method, Carter has given workshops and master classes at numerous institutions. She was Artist in Residence at her alma mater, Oakland University from 2007- 2018. She has also taught at the jazz summer camp at Stanford Jazz Workshop. In 2018, she was named Artistic Director of the New Jersey Performing Arts All-Female Jazz Camp.

During the 2000s, Carter performed at the head of a quintet. In 2005, she performed on Eddie Palmieri's album Listen Here! which won a Grammy award for best Latin Jazz album. In May 2006, she was toured with Darryl Harper (clarinet), Xavier Davis (piano), Alvester Garnett (drums)(still with her in 2011), and Matt Parish (Upright bass).

Carter was awarded a MacArthur Fellows Program grant, also known as a "genius grant", in September 2006. The award includes a grant of $500,000 over five years, and the committee stated this about Carter:

Regina Carter is a master of improvisational jazz violin. Though her work draws upon a wide range of musical influences – including Motown, Afro-Cuban, Swing, Bebop, Folk, and World – she has crafted a signature voice and style. ... Carter's performances highlight the often overlooked potential of the jazz violin for its lyric, melodic, and percussive potential. Her early training as a classical musician is reflected in the fluidity, grace, and balance of her performance. Carter's repertoire retains a firm connection with the familiar while venturing in new, unexpected directions. ... Through artistry with an instrument that has been defined predominantly by the classical tradition, Carter is pioneering new possibilities for the violin and for jazz.

In 2018, Carter was a recipient of the Doris Duke Award.

Carter married Alvester Garnett in Detroit, Michigan, on September 5, 2004. Garnett is the drummer in her band. She has been a resident of Maywood, New Jersey.

Discography
As leader or co-leader
1995 Regina Carter (Atlantic)
1997 Something for Grace (Atlantic)
1999 Rhythms of the Heart (Verve)
2000 Motor City Moments (Verve)
2001 Freefall (Verve) with Kenny Barron
2003 Paganini: After a Dream (Verve)
2006 I'll Be Seeing You: A Sentimental Journey (Verve)
2010 Reverse Thread (E1 Entertainment)
2014 Southern Comfort (Masterworks)
2017 Ella: Accentuate the Positive (Masterworks)
With the String Trio of New York
Intermobility (Arabesque, 1992)
Octagon (Black Saint, 1992)
Blues...? (Black Saint, 1993)
An Outside Job (AA, 1994)

With Kenny Barron
Spirit Song (Verve, 1999)
With Anthony Davis
Ellington / Monk / Mingus / Davis (Music & Arts, 1997)
With Mark Helias
Loopin' the Cool (Enja, 1995)
With Elliott Sharp
Xenocodex (Tzadik, 1996)
With Cassandra Wilson
Traveling Miles (Blue Note, 1999) on two tracks
With Steve Turre
Lotus Flower (Verve, 1999)
With James Carter
Chasin' the Gypsy (Atlantic, 2000)
Caribbean Rhapsody (EmArcy, 2011)
With Sir Simon Rattle, Luther Henderson, City of Birmingham Symphony Orchestra, Lena Horne
Classic Ellington (EMI Classics, 2000)
With Carmen Lundy
Something to Believe In (Justin Time, 2003) on three tracks
With Joe Jackson 
The Duke (Razor & Tie, 2012) on three tracks
Fast Forward (Caroline, 2015) on four tracks
With Eddie Palmieri
Listen Here! (Concord Records, 2005)
With Danilo Perez
Motherland  (Verve Records, 2000)
With Wynton Marsalis
Blood on the Fields (Columbia Records, 1997)
With the Soldier String Quartet
In Four Color, 2015)
Inspect for Damaged Gods, 2004)
Jazz Standards on Mars, 1997) with Robert Dick, Richard Bona
With Dave Soldier
Chamber Music, 2006) on one track

References

Notes
 W. Enstice, J. Stockhouse Jazzwomen. Conversations with 21 Musicians. Bloomington 2004. , pp. 65ff. (bio & interview)

External links
 Official website
 "Regina Carter's Encounter with a 'Cannon'", from National Public Radio Morning Edition program, May 14, 2003
 Regina Carter: Improvising a Life in Jazz, AllAboutJazz, February 18, 2006
 Regina Carter: Translating African Folk To The Jazz Violin, from National Public Radio Studio Sessions, May 21, 2010
 Audio Interview with Joe Zupan

American jazz violinists
Cass Technical High School alumni
MacArthur Fellows
New England Conservatory alumni
Oakland University alumni
Musicians from Detroit
American women jazz musicians
1966 births
Living people
Verve Records artists
African-American jazz musicians
People from Maywood, New Jersey
Jazz musicians from Michigan
21st-century American violinists
21st-century American women musicians
String Trio of New York members
African-American women musicians
21st-century African-American women
20th-century African-American people
20th-century African-American women
Atlantic Records artists
Okeh Records artists